Mattias Adolfsson (born 1965) is a Swedish graphic artist and illustrator, known for his detailed and quirky drawings in ink and watercolor.  He lives and works in Sigtuna, just outside of Stockholm, Sweden.

Early career 

He was educated at the University of Art and Design in Gothenburg and holds a Master of Arts in Graphic design.  Originally he began training as an engineer but found the non-math parts to be very boring so he changed to Architecture, and then to Graphic Design. Adolfsson worked as a video game designer, using his knowledge of mathematics and architecture to create 3D images for the gaming industry for 10 years.

Game Credits
Kosmopolska (1997) - Design - Concept and Game Idea

Art/Graphics
Battlefield: Bad Company (2008)	 	(Additional Artists)
Race 07: Official WTCC Game (2007)	 	(Track Artists)
Race: The Official WTCC Game (2006) 	(Track Artists)
RalliSport Challenge 2 (2004)	 	    (Artists)
Stardom: Your Quest For Fame (2000)	(Graphic Form)
Backpacker 2 (1997)	 	            (Illustration, Animation)

Methods 

Adolfsson promotes the use of a sketchbook, which he carries with him everywhere.  As he travels or any other time he has, he will use his fountain pen and create a fantasy world based on what he sees around him. His journals have served as a basis for much of his published work and he has filled 39 of them in the last decade, showing his progress on his social media sites.  When he returns to his studio, he uses an ink wash to add shadow and depth and then adds watercolor to the drawings.

He has been a big proponent of using social media, including blogs, Instagram and Twitter to make his art available to all and to advertise his skills.

His methods and some of his works are featured in an eight page spread in Sketching from the Imagination: An Insight into Creative Drawing from 3dtotal Publishing, created to provide inspiration for other artists.  One of his drawings also appears on the cover.

Album covers 
In 2007, Adolfsson was contacted to create the cover art for Dance Gavin Dance's album “Downtown Battle Mountain” and has collaborated on all of their albums since then.  He has also created framework for posters advertising their concerts, single artwork and various other pieces of work used by the band.

 Downtown Battle Mountain, 2007,  Rise Records
 Dance, Gavin, Dance, 2008, Rise Records
 The Old Ceremony – Walk on Thin Air, 2009, Alyosha Records
 Downtown Battle Mountain II, 2011,  Rise Records
 Acceptance Speech, 2013, Rise Records
 Instant Gratification , 2015,  Rise Records
 Mothership, 2016, Rise Records
 Afterburner, 2020, Rise Records
 Jackpot Juicer, 2022, Rise Records

After discovering Adolfsson's works in a comic shop, Weezer's frontman River Cuomo became infatuated with Adolfsson's work and he was asked to produce the artwork for their OK Human album, released in 2021. Dig! named it as one of the top 10 Album Covers for 2021.

Notable illustrations 

Adolfsson has produced works for Disney, the New York Times, WIRED, and The New Yorker.

 This is how hit pop songs are created. DN.SE. November 1, 2015. Read April 22, 2020, Davidson, Adam (December 28, 2011).
 Will China Outsmart the US?(In American English). The New York Times. . Read April 22, 2020.
 Visiting Swedish Illustrator Mattias Adolfsson's Planet On His First Trip To Taiwan(in English), Kassy Cho, City543. Read April 22, 2020.
 Here is the most beautiful book of the year. April 23, 2020.
 AI-AP | American Illustration – American Photography. www.ai-ap.com, Read April 23, 2020

Mattias Adolfsson has created commissioned artwork for Atelier Choux used on baby blankets and packaging, Chipotle, and Nickelodeon.

Regatta, 24" x 32" 1500 piece puzzle, Publisher: Heye, UPC: 4001689298913
Spaceship, 24" x 32" 1500 piece puzzle, Publisher: Heye, UPC: 4001689298418
Music Maniac, 19.5" x 27.5" 1000 piece puzzle, Publisher: Heye, UPC: 4001689299286
Curiosity Cabinet, 24" x 32" 1500 piece puzzle, Publisher: Heye, UPC: 4001689297947
Illustrator for Carlsen, Bonnier, Till mitt barnbarn, 15 Oct. 2009,

Awards 
American Illustration (AI # 39) – Two images from "The Second in Line" selected by jury for inclusion in the hardcover annual.
The Most Beautiful Book of the Year 2013 (Swedish Book Art). Each year the Swedish Book Association selects the top 25 books in numerous categories, including art.  The 25 selected entries receive diplomas and the selected entries are presented in an exhibition catalog and on the Swedish Book Art's website. The books are displayed at the Royal Library in Stockholm and at exhibitions in various places in Sweden and internationally for one year. In addition, they represent Sweden in the international book competition Die Schönsten Bücher aus aller Welt, which exhibits every year at the fairs in Leipzig and Frankfurt.
Best Album Artwork - Afterburner - Dance Gavin Dance - Heavy Music Awards - 2021

Personal life 

Adolfsson is married to Cecilia Levy, also an artist, and has two daughters.   He enjoys skiing and hiking in the Swedish countryside.

Publications 
 Mattias Unfiltered: The Sketchbook Art of Mattias Adolfsson, 2012, BOOM! Studios, 
 Mattias Adolfsson's Traffic (Pictura), 2014, Templar Publishing,  
 First in Line, 2011, Sanatorium Forlag,  
 Second in Line, 2013, Sanatorium Forlag, 
 Third in Line, 2015, Sanatorium Forlag,

References

External links
Mattias Ink - Instagram
Mattias Adolfsson Web Site

1965 births
Living people
Swedish illustrators
Swedish graphic designers
21st-century Swedish artists